The Tampere Ring Road (Finnish: Tampereen kehätie) or former Finnish National Road 60 (Finnish: Kantatie 60) is a ring road in Tampere sub-region, Finland. It leads (from west to east) from Ylöjärvi to Tampere, passing by Nokia and Pirkkala. Its western part forms part of Highway 3 (between Helsinki and Vaasa), while its eastern part forms part of Highway 9 (between Turku and Tohmajärvi).

The entire length of the ring road has been a motorway since 2009. The main stretch of the ring road sees over 50,000 vehicles per day. According to the ELY Centre of Pirkanmaa, the western part of the ring road is the busiest road in Finland, if highway and ring road connections in the Helsinki metropolitan area are excluded.

See also
Highways in Finland

References

External links
Matti Grönroosin sivu kantatiestä 60 (in Finnish)

Roads in Finland
Ring roads in Finland
Ring road